The Amakusa coalfield consists of a group of coal mines on the main island of Amakusa, Kumamoto, Japan.

History
The northern Amakusa coalfield has been discovered under the Kyoho era (between 1716 and 1736), while Oniki, the southern part of the coalfield  was discovered under the Tenpo era (between 1830 and 1843). The exploitation started in the northern part under the Meiji era. In 1897, a railroad was constructed for the transport of coal between northern mines and Tomioka Bay now Reihoku, Kumamoto by Dainippon Rentan Company. Between 1900 and 1912, a monthly production of 4000 tons was recorded. In other areas, horse-drawn vehicles  were employed. However, Amakusa coal mine was characterized by relatively thin layers of coal (30 cm - 100 cm) and the mining condition was relatively difficult. So, only small-sized or medium-sized enterprises took part in the ventures. On the contrary, the characteristics of coal were good, such as anthracite, and the Japanese Imperial Navy bought Amakusa coal mine in great quantities.

The Change of the Government Policy
Around 1950, the Japanese government changed its policy and started importing cheap coal from foreign countries, and many Japanese coal mines had to be discontinued. Amakusa coal mines were no exception.  One of the southern Amakusa mines, Okini coal mine discontinued in 1975. Since there were no big enterprises, it is believed that more than 5,000,000 tons of coal remains there.

Names of Amakusa Coal Mines around 1955
Northern mines
Sakasegawa, Ootake, Shiki, Reishu, Takenosako, Komatsu, Wakunobori, Kuratsuki, Ryoumatsu
Central mines
Imatomi, Asahimuen
Southern mines
Oniki, Gongen-yama, Sunatsuki, Horinosako, Nanten, Nakanoura

Yearly Amounts Produced

References
Amakusachiku Kensetugyoukyoukai, History of Constructions in Amakusa 1978, Amakusachiku Kensetsugyoukyoukai.

Footnotes

Kumamoto Prefecture
Coal mines in Japan